Carlos Obregón Santacilia (1896–1961) was a Mexican art déco architect. He trained at the Academy of San Carlos during the Mexican Revolution.  He claimed a distinguished Mexican heritage, as great grandson of Benito Juárez and grand nephew of Alvaro Obregón.

Obregón saw the new architecture following the violent and destructive Mexican Revolution as the government's impulse to be constructive.  Among other works, Obregón Santacilia redesigned the building housing the Secretariat of Foreign Relations, at the request of Alberto J. Pani. The building went from a Louis XIV style structure to a neo-Colonial work, opened in 1924. Minister of Public Education in the Obregón government, José Vasconcelos asked Obregón Santacilia to design a large primary school in Mexico City, to be built in "new nationalist perspective." He also designed the new building for the Secretariat of Health and Welfare (1926), later decorated with murals by Diego Rivera. He reworked the abandoned legislative palace of the Díaz era and transformed it to the Monumento a la Revolución, located in Mexico City.

Publications
El Maquinismo, la Vida y la Arquitectura/Machines, Life, and Architecture. Cleveland: J.H. Jansen 1939.
Cincuenta (50) Años de Arquitectura Mexicana (1900-1950). Mexico City: Editorial Patria 1952.
El Monumento a la Revolución, Simbolismo e Historia. Mexico: Secretaria de Educación Pública, Departamento de Divulgación 1960.

Further reading
Garay Arellano, Graciela de. La Obra de Carlos Obregón Santacilia, Arquitecto. Mexico City: Secretaría de Educación Pública, INBA 1982.
Olsen, Patrice Elizabeth, Artifacts of Revolution: Architecture, Society, and Politics in Mexico City, 1920-1940. Lanham MD: Rowman & Littlefield 2008.

See also
Architecture of Mexico

References

Art Deco architects
Modernist architects from Mexico
1896 births
1961 deaths
Art Deco architecture in Mexico
20th-century Mexican architects